David Shearer's first frontbench team was announced in December 2011 following the 2011 New Zealand general election and Shearer's own election to the Labour Party leadership.

List of shadow ministers

Frontbench teams
The list below contains Shearer's spokespeople and their respective roles:

First iteration
Shearer announced his first lineup on 19 December 2011.

Second iteration
Shearer announced a major reshuffle in February 2013. Additional portfolios were adjusted in June 2013 after the death of sitting MP and Maori Affairs spokesperson Parekura Horomia.

References

New Zealand Labour Party
Shearer, David
2011 in New Zealand
2011 establishments in New Zealand
2013 disestablishments in New Zealand